The Z 50 is an APS-C mirrorless camera (1.5x APS crop) announced by Nikon on October 10, 2019. It is Nikon's first Z-mount crop sensor camera body. With its introduction, Nikon also announced two crop-sensor Z-mount lenses. It is the third Z-mount camera body after the Nikon Z 7 and Nikon Z 6. The camera yields a 20-megapixel still image and 4K video (up to 30 fps and 30 minutes time limit per clip), however it does not have In-Body Image Stabilisation (IBIS) nor does it include built-in sensor cleaning.

Photo gallery

References

Z 50
Z 50
Cameras introduced in 2019